Marinus Kuijf (also Riny Kuijf; born 12 February 1960), is a Dutch chess International Master (IM) (1983), Dutch Chess Championship winner (1989), Chess Olympiad team bronze medalist (1988).

Biography

In 1988, Marinus Kuijf won bronze in the Dutch Chess Championship in Hilversum, and in 1989 became the winner of that championship.

Marinus Kuijf is winner of many international chess tournaments, including winning 2nd place (1983) and twice 3rd place in Wijk aan Zee "B" tournament (1986, 1989), winning Guernsey (1988), twice 2nd place in Groningen (1988, 1990), shared 1st place in Sas van Gent (1992), shared 2nd place (1992) and shared 1st place twice in Sitges (1993, 1994).

Marinus Kuijf played for Netherlands in the Chess Olympiad:
 In 1988, at first reserve board in the 28th Chess Olympiad in Thessaloniki (+4, =1, -1) and won team bronze medal.

Marinus Kuijf played for Netherlands in the World Team Chess Championship:
 In 1989, at second reserve board in the 2nd World Team Chess Championship in Lucerne (+0, =1, -3).

Marinus Kuijf played for Netherlands in the European Team Chess Championships:
 In 1989, at first reserve board in the 9th European Team Chess Championship in Haifa (+0, =1, -1).

In 1983, he was awarded the FIDE International Master (IM) title.

References

External links

Marinus Kuijf chess games at 365chess.com

1960 births
Living people
Dutch chess players
Chess International Masters
Chess Olympiad competitors
20th-century Dutch people